The Jamul Mountains are a mountain range of the Peninsular Ranges System.

They are located in southernmost San Diego County, Southern California. The Mexico–United States border is nearby to the south.

There is a trail starting at Upper Otay Lake that leads over the western part of the range.

Gallery

References 

Peninsular Ranges
Mountain ranges of San Diego County, California
Mountain ranges of Southern California